Subtropical Storm Alpha (also called Alfa) was an off-season subtropical cyclone that hit Georgia in May 1972. It developed from a previously non-tropical cyclone in the western Atlantic Ocean, and initially it moved northeastward off the Carolinas. The storm turned southwestward due to a building ridge, and concurrently it intensified to become Subtropical Storm Alpha. It later moved ashore near Savannah, and it finally dissipated in the northeast Gulf of Mexico on May 29. It produced wave action and moderate rainfall along the coast. Damage totaled over $100,000 (1972 USD), and there were two associated deaths.

Meteorological history

Throughout May 1972, a series of weak troughs moved across the eastern United States. In the third week of the month, an upper-level cutoff low developed along one of these troughs, located southeast of the United States and removed from the Westerlies. The origins of Alpha were from a surface low northeast of Florida, associated with the larger-scale, cold core upper low. It organized, and late on May 23 it could be classified as a subtropical depression, east of the Georgia/South Carolina border. While southeast of Hatteras, North Carolina, a developing ridge blocked its northeast motion, and so it slowed to turn to the southeast. On May 25, a small, intense low-level center organized rapidly, and by the next day it attained gale-force winds, by which time the storm turned southwestward. At 1600 UTC on May 26, the National Hurricane Center initiated advisories on Subtropical Cyclone Alpha, when the storm was about 225 miles south of Cape Hatteras. Around that time, it reached its peak winds of 70 mph (110 km/h).

On its first advisory, there was disagreement among forecast models regarding its eventual track, with projected tracks deviating from a Georgia landfall to a track northeastward out to sea. Alpha was also a climatological outlier at the time; the NHC HURRAN model, which was based on previous storms with similar characteristics, found no analogs for the storm. Subtropical Storm Alpha was initially well-defined as it moved southwestward. The very small center was located along the eastern edge of the convection, while low-level cloud bands formed east of the center. At the time, the temperature structure was more typical of a winter storm, although it was expected to become more like a subtropical storm typical during the summer months. The winds decreased steadily as it turned more westward on May 27, and the heavy rainfall persisted mostly to the north and west of the center.

The National Hurricane Center initially thought the center might not have been at the surface, and the agency indicated low forecasting confidence, as they could not determine a circulation center. The difficulty arose from the large, sprawling nature of the storm, and by later on May 27 a new center formed, as confirmed by radar imagery and the Hurricane Hunters. That night, the extremely small center made landfall just south of Savannah, Georgia, affecting a very small area with winds of 65 mph (100 km/h) and a minimum pressure of 991 mbar (hPa; 29.26 inHg). Around the time of landfall, Alpha developed a warm core, indicating some tropical characteristics. The storm weakened quickly over land, although it did not dissipate until two days later over the northeast Gulf of Mexico.

Preparations and impact

At the time of the first advisory on Alpha, there were small craft warnings from Jacksonville, Florida to Cape May, New Jersey. Gale warnings were posted from Cape Fear, North Carolina to Chincoteague, Virginia. The interaction between Alpha and the high pressure system to its northeast caused cooler temperatures and gusty winds from Delaware southward. Wave heights reached up to  along the Virginia capes. The storm dropped rainfall along the coast of North Carolina and Virginia, with a maximum of  reported in Ocracoke, North Carolina. While moving slowly off the North Carolina coast, Alpha caused heavy beach erosion, destroyed one house, and threatened the foundation of several other homes in the Outer Banks. Damage totaled over $50,000 (1972 USD).

While the storm was traveling over the western Atlantic Ocean, the storm produced a large area of rough seas, which was considered the greatest threat from the storm. In northeastern Florida, police officers were stationed to ensure people did not swim in the dangerous seas. The high waves also halted work to deepen a harbor at the Mayport Naval Station. Two people drowned after the storm dissipated, when surf was still turbulent. Wind gusts reached  on Saint Simons Island. The winds knocked down trees and power lines, leaving some people without power in eastern Georgia. Damage was minor but widespread in the state, estimated at over $50,000 (1972 USD). Moderate rains spread in coastal areas from South Carolina through southern Florida.

Naming
The 1972 hurricane season was the first year in which quasi-tropical cyclones were named, by using the NATO phonetic alphabet. At the time, the names were applied to large subtropical cyclones and small neutercanes, both of which were later combined into one category. After the 1973 season, however, this practice was dropped. The name "Alpha" (as part of the Greek alphabet) was later reused in 2005 and 2020, but it was used in these cases to name storms after the standard list of names was exhausted.

See also

List of Florida hurricanes (1950–1974)
Subtropical Storm Andrea (2007)
Tropical Storm Beryl (2012)

References

External links
National Hurricane Center
Monthly Weather Review for 1972

1972 Atlantic hurricane season
Alpha
Alpha
Alpha
Alpha